Mitchell Owen (born 16 September 2001) is an Australian cricketer. He made his Twenty20 debut on 12 January 2021, for the Hobart Hurricanes, in the 2020–21 Big Bash League season. He made his List A debut on 22 February 2021, for Tasmania in the 2020–21 Marsh One-Day Cup.

References

External links
 

2001 births
Living people
Australian cricketers
Hobart Hurricanes cricketers
Tasmania cricketers
Place of birth missing (living people)